Love in Persian() is a Television film in the genre of drama, romance and road directed by Florian Baxmeyer produced in Germany in 2018.

Plot 
Robert Leitner is a stiff young German recycling specialist who fell out with his father Achim.  Then his father disappeared.  His mother says he traveled to Iran to collect an old bill and thus save her company from bankruptcy.  Robert then sets off for Iran at the request of his mother.  There he is greeted by Shirin, an Iranian German teacher.  At that time, her aunt Mehrnaz bought the weaving machines and then did not pay for them.  Robert soon finds out that his father was often in Iran and a different person there.

Then Achim reappears at home.  Robert stays in Iran anyway to learn more about his father from Mehrnaz.  Since Robert and Shirin are not allowed to travel to Mehrnaz in Kaschan together, Robert first converts to Islam and then marries Shirin for a while.  On the journey, the two get closer.  Shirin, who is herself enthusiastic about the German poets Schiller and Goethe, shows Robert something of the Iranian culture.  Robert, on the other hand, is reluctant.  When Robert learns that Shirin is already engaged, he is disappointed.

Meanwhile Achim has also traveled to Iran and Kashan.  Mehrnaz demands the 100,000 euros bridal allowance agreed in the marriage contract for Shirin, as Achim refuses to get to know their son Roshan.  Achim then steals two valuable carpets and wants to flee with his son.  When Robert found out, he gave the carpets back to Mehrnaz.  His half-brother Roshan accompanies him and Achim to the airport.  There they are overtaken by Mehrnaz and Shirin.  Shirin said no at the wedding.

Cast  
 Felix Klare as Robert
 Mona Pirzad as Shirin
 Johanna Bittenbinder as Irmi Leitner
 Pejman Bazeghi as Roshan
 Roya Teymourian as Mehrnaz
 Günther Maria Halmer as Achim Leitner
 Bettina Mittendorfer as Frau Brahminger
 Titus Kuhn as Robert jung
 Sourus Parsah as Farzad

Production 
The film was produced under the name Hello, Persia.  The film was the first foreign production in Iran since 1978. The shooting took place between September 5 and October 13, 2017 in Tehran, Kashan and Munich.  Various scenes in Iran such as jumping into the pool and the common bed scene were filmed in Germany.  An alternative cut version was created for Iranian television.
The film was shown for the first time at the Festival of German Films in Ludwigshafen am Rhein.  The film was first broadcast on ARD on Friday, October 19, 2018.

Reception 

Tittelbach.tv rates the film more positively.

References

External links 
 

2018 films
German comedy road movies
German romantic comedy-drama films
German television films
Films shot in Iran
2010s German films
Das Erste original programming